The 1999 West Dorset District Council election was held on Thursday 6 May 1999 to elect councillors to West Dorset District Council in England. It took place on the same day as other district council elections in the United Kingdom. The entire council was up for election.

The 1999 election saw the Conservatives become the largest party on the council but fall short of a majority.

Ward results

Beaminster

Bothenhampton

Bradford Abbas

Bradpole

Bridport North

Bridport South

Broadmayne

Broadwindsor

Burton Bradstock

Caundle Vale

Cerne Valley

Charminster

Charmouth

Chesil Bank

Chickerell

Dorchester East

Dorchester North

Dorchester South

Dorchester West

Frome Valley

Halstock

Holnest

Loders

Lyme Regis

Maiden Newton

Netherbury

Owermoigne

Piddle Valley

Puddletown

Queen Thorne

Sherborne East

Sherborne West

Symondsbury

Thorncombe

Tolpuddle

Whitchurch Canonicorum

Winterborne St Martin

Yetminster

References

West Dorset
1999
20th century in Dorset